Le mariage du ciel et de l'enfer (French: The marriage of heaven and hell) is the sixth album by Art Zoyd, released in 1985 through Cryonic Inc. The album is the first by Art Zoyd available in an expanded form on compact disc.

Track listing

Vinyl pressing

CD pressing

Personnel 
Art Zoyd
Patricia Dallio – electric piano, piano, keyboards
Gérard Hourbette – viola, violin, keyboards, electric piano, piano, percussion
Jean-Pierre Soarez – trumpet, percussion
Thierry Zaboitzeff – bass guitar, cello, vocals, tape, keyboards, percussion
Production and additional personnel
Art Zoyd – production, mixing
Keith Haring – illustrations
Gilles Martin – mixing
Christian Petron – photography
Unsafe Graphics – design
Robert Vogel – recording

References

External links 
 

1985 albums
Art Zoyd albums